Allen Zollars (September 3, 1839 – December 20, 1909) was a politician and judge in Indiana who served as a justice of the Indiana Supreme Court from January 1, 1883, to January 7, 1889.

Zollars was born in Licking County, Ohio, to Frederick Zollars (December 11, 1801 – 1889) and Anna Whitmore (February 21, 1806-?). He received a B.A. from Denison University in Granville, Ohio, in or about 1863, and briefly studied law in Ohio before entering the University of Michigan Law School, where he received a Bachelor of Law in 1866.

He was elected as a Representative to the Indiana State in 1869, and also served as City Attorney of Fort Wayne, Indiana from 1869 to 1875. In 1877, he became the first person to serve as a judge of the Superior Court of Allen County, Indiana. He was elected to the Indiana Supreme Court in 1882, serving from 1883 to 1889, having failed to win reelection in 1888, a year when the Democratic Party did poorly throughout the state.

Zollars died in Fort Wayne.

Personal life
He married Marinda Holmes Ewing (1845-1912) and had three children, Frederick L. Zollars (1869-1951), Charles Ewing Zollars (1875-1944), and Clara Zollars. Allen has three grandchildren, two from Charles and one from Clara. And as well as four great-grandchildren all from Charles.

References

References

Justices of the Indiana Supreme Court
1839 births
1909 deaths
Denison University alumni
University of Michigan Law School alumni
People from Licking County, Ohio
19th-century American judges